Marie-Castille Mention-Schaar (born 26 January 1963) is a French film director, producer and screenwriter. She is most noted for her 2016 film Heaven Will Wait (Le Ciel attendra), for which she was a nominee for the Lumières Award for Best Screenplay at the 22nd Lumières Awards.

Her newest film, A Good Man, was named as an Official Selection of the 2020 Cannes Film Festival.

Filmography
Wah-Wah - 2005
Ma première fois - 2012
Bowling - 2012
Once in a Lifetime (Les Héritiers) - 2014
Heaven Will Wait (Le Ciel attendra) - 2016
All About Mothers (La Fête des mères) - 2018
A Good Man - 2020

References

External links

1963 births
French film directors
French screenwriters
French film producers
French women film directors
French women screenwriters
French women film producers
Living people